James A. Ten Eyck (October 16, 1851 – February 11, 1938) was a crew coach at United States Naval Academy and Syracuse University. He was born in Tompkins Cove, New York and is the father of Edward H. "Ned" Ten Eyck, who coached crew for the University of Wisconsin–Madison from 1907 to 1910, and took over coaching duties at Syracuse from his father after his death.  He was inducted into the Greater Syracuse Sports Hall of Fame on October 21, 2002.

Coaching career
Ten Eyck began his coaching career at the Naval Academy from 1899 to 1901. He moved to Syracuse University in 1903 after Edwin Sweetland resigned the post.  As Syracuse coach, he captured ten National Championships.

For his coaching accomplishments James Ten Eyck was honored in several ways.  The Ten Eyck Trophy, awarded to the all-points champion at the Intercollegiate Rowing Association Regatta is named for him.  In 1937, Syracuse named the boathouse for the rowing teams the James Ten Eyck Memorial Boathouse.

National Championships
Varsity: 1908, 1913,1916 and 1920
Freshman's squads: 1906, 1915, 1922, 1925, 1929 and 1930

References

External links
 Syracuse Hall of Fame bio

1851 births
1938 deaths
American male rowers
American people of Dutch descent
Navy Midshipmen rowing coaches
Syracuse Orange rowing coaches
James A.